Azamat Abduraimov (born 27 April 1966) is a former Uzbek professional football player, who represented Uzbekistan national football team on 22 occasions between 1992 and 1997.

Early years
Azamat Abduraimov was born in Tashkent in 1966. His father, Berador Abduraimov, is the best Uzbek goals scorer in the 20th century and one of the best FC Pakhtakor Tashkent players ever. When Azamat was three years old, his father moved to Moscow to play for CSKA.

Azamat started his football career in Spartak Moskva football youth academy (ФШМ). Being in the Soviet Army, he was playing for SKA Rostov-na-Donu and CSKA Moskva.

Personal life 
Azamat is a father of Alia Azamat Ashkenazi, American Screenwriter and Director who co-wrote a soccer documentary "Misha" directed by Brian Song in which Azamat was featured as one of the characters.

Playing career

Pakhtakor Tashkent
Most of honours were achieved by Azamat while he played for Pakhtakor. He joined Pakhtakor three times and spent more than seven seasons of his playing career there (scored more than 60 goals).

First time he was playing for Pakhtakor from 1987 until 1990 in Soviet First League, scored 25 times. He left Pakhtakor in the middle of 1990 season to join Spartak Moskva.

Next time he returned to Pakhtakor in 1996, and spent three seasons in the team, scored 37 times and won Uzbek League in 1998 and Uzbekistani Cup in 1997.

Last season Azamat played for Pakhtakor was 2000 when he was already 34.

Spartak Moskva
During 1990 Azamat was the bench player of Spartak Moskva, gaining only three first team appearances. He scored a lot for reserve team during that time, however, he couldn't achieve a first team place and left to Pamir Dushanbe.

Foreign countries
During his career, Azamat Abduraimov become one of the first Uzbekistani players who began playing in foreign countries. He played for different teams in 4 non-ex USSR countries (Bangladesh, Malaysia, Saudi Arabia, India). In 1991, during his time with Mohammedan SC, Azamat showcased one of the best goal to game ratio in Bangladesh domestic football history, scoring 17 goals in only 12 games. He managed to win the Dhaka League title during his year-long stay at the club. With National Football League (India) side Salgaocar SC, he won the prestigious Durand Cup in 1999.

International career
Abduraimov made his international debut on 28 June 1992 against Turkmenistan in a 2-1 win match. He achieved 22 caps for Uzbekistan national football team as player. Most notable of his international appearances was at the 1994 Asian Games football tournament in Hiroshima, where the Uzbekistan team won the gold medal.

The most significant of his football career was the goal scored in the semifinal match at the Asian Games against South Korea. The decisive goal (South Korea lost to Uzbekistan 0:1) was considered The Best in the tournament, as well as the best and the "Golden Goal" in the history of Uzbek football.

Also, he played international futsal games as a member of Uzbekistan national futsal team at World 5's Futsal 2003 in Kuala Lumpur, and became a threat to team Japan, according to next year's Japanese futsal report of AFC Futsal Championship.

Managing career
Azamat Abduraimov played his farewell match in 2002, which was the most incendiary sport show in Uzbekistan. In 2002–2003 season he was "playing coach" in NBU Osiyo (1st league). In 2003 played in Uzbekistan national futsal team at the Asian Championship in Indonesia. In 2004 season he worked as a head coach of Uzbekistan national futsal team, whish was playing in Asian Championship in Iran and Malaysia 2004 AFC Futsal Championship. Then in 2005 he spent some time managing Uzbek futsal club FC Ardus (gained Uzbek futsal championship title in 2005).

In 2006–2007 he was G.M. at the Native football foundation In 2006, he graduated from Russia High Coaches School.

On 28 October 2008 he was appointed as sports director in FC Bunyodkor. During 2009–2010 season he was the head coach of FK Samarqand-Dinamo. In 2009 Azamat ranked the third place in the ranking of the Football Coach of the Year in Uzbekistan. In 2010, he received a coaching PRO license.

In January 2012 he was appointed by the Football Federation as assistant coach of Uzbekistan U-22. On 22 August 2012 he signed a contract with FK Andijan as head coach of the club. On 18 June 2014 he resigned from his post as Andijan coach. 
On 4 February 2020 he resigned his post as head coach of Uzbekistan U-17.

Honours

Club
Pakhtakor
Soviet First League Cup: 1988, 1989
Uzbek League: 1998
Uzbek Cup: 1997

Mohammedan Sporting Club
Dhaka League: 1992, Top-scorer (with 17 goals)

Navbahor Namangan
Uzbek Cup: 1992

Pahang FA
Malaysian Super League: 1994

Al Wahda
Saudi First Division: 1996

Salgaocar
Durand Cup: 1999

Country
Uzbekistan
Asian Games: 1994

References

External links
 
 Uzbekistan national football team stats 

1966 births
Living people
Sportspeople from Tashkent
Uzbekistani footballers
Uzbekistani expatriate sportspeople in Malaysia
Uzbekistani people of Kazakhstani descent
Uzbekistan international footballers
1996 AFC Asian Cup players
Expatriate footballers in Malaysia
FC Spartak Moscow players
PFC CSKA Moscow players
Pakhtakor Tashkent FK players
CSKA Pamir Dushanbe players
FC SKA Rostov-on-Don players
Sri Pahang FC players
Mohammedan SC (Dhaka) players
Navbahor Namangan players
Al-Wehda Club (Mecca) players
salgaocar FC players
FC Dustlik players
Uzbekistani expatriate sportspeople in Saudi Arabia
Uzbekistani expatriate sportspeople in India
Uzbekistani expatriate sportspeople in Bangladesh
Expatriate footballers in Saudi Arabia
Expatriate footballers in India
Expatriate footballers in Bangladesh
Asian Games gold medalists for Uzbekistan
Asian Games medalists in football
Association football forwards
Footballers at the 1994 Asian Games
Medalists at the 1994 Asian Games
FC FShM Torpedo Moscow players
National Football League (India) players
Vasco SC players
Calcutta Football League players
FK Dinamo Samarqand managers
FK Andijan managers